The 2016 European Junior Cup was the sixth and last season of the European Junior Cup. It was contested by riders aged 14–21 (24 for females) on equal Honda CBR650F bikes over eight races, starting on 3 April at Motorland Aragón and ending on 16 October at Jerez.

Spanish rider Mika Pérez claimed the championship title, while the Women's European Cup was won by Avalon Biddle, from New Zealand.

Entry list

Race calendar and results

Championship standings

Riders' championship

Women's European Cup

References

External links
 
 Official Superbike World Championship website

2016 in motorcycle sport
Junior